First Baptist Christian School is a private, Independent Baptist kindergarten, elementary school and high Christian school located at 1211 North Vermilion Street in Danville, Vermilion County, Illinois, United States. It is a member of the Illinois Association of Christian Schools and American Association of Christian Schools.

The school was founded in 1953 as an educational ministry of Danville's First Baptist Church. Its current divisions are elementary, which includes kindergarten through grade 6, and secondary, which includes grades 7 through 12. The school's stated mission is "to make the most of Jesus Christ through spiritual, academic, physical, and social development."

References

External links
 

Baptist schools in the United States
Christian schools in Illinois
Private elementary schools in Illinois
Private middle schools in Illinois
Private high schools in Illinois
Schools in Vermilion County, Illinois
Buildings and structures in Danville, Illinois
Educational institutions established in 1953
1953 establishments in Illinois